Bernardo José Piñango Figuera (born February 9, 1960 in Caracas) is a retired professional boxer from Venezuela who held the WBA (twice), The Ring and lineal bantamweight titles. As an amateur boxer, he won a silver medal in the bantamweight division (-54 kg) at the 1980 Summer Olympics in Moscow. In the final he lost to Cuba's Juan Hernández on points (0-5).

Amateur career
Amateur Record: 110-10 (73)
Silver medalist at the Boxam de Espana (1977)
Gold medalist at the 34th Central American Championships (1977)
1978 Venezuelan Featherweight Champion
Silver medalist at the 1980 Moscow Olympic Games in the bantamweight class. His results were:
Round of 64: bye
Round of 32: Defeated Ernesto Alguera (Nicaragua) by decision, 4-1
Round of 16: Defeated Veli Koota (Finland) by disqualification, round 2
Quarterfinal: Defeated John Siryakibbe (Uganda) knockout in round 2
Semifinal: Defeated Dumitru Cipere (Romania) by decision, 3-2
Final: Lost to Juan Hernandez (Cuba) by decision, 0-5 (was awarded silver medal)

Professional career
Piñango became a pro in 1981, and won the Lineal and  WBA Bantamweight title on June 4, 1986 against Mexican-American boxer Gaby Canizales. He defended the title three times including against Italian boxer Ciro De Leva. which he lost on March 29, 1987. From February 27, 1988 until May 28, 1988 he was the holder of the WBA Super Bantamweight Belt. He boxed his last match on April 7, 1990 in Las Vegas.

Professional boxing record

See also
List of world bantamweight boxing champions
List of world super-bantamweight boxing champions

References

External links

Bernardo Piñango - The Cyber Boxing Zone Encyclopedia

 

|-

1960 births
Living people
Venezuelan male boxers
Sportspeople from Caracas
Olympic boxers of Venezuela
Boxers at the 1980 Summer Olympics
Olympic medalists in boxing
Olympic silver medalists for Venezuela
Medalists at the 1980 Summer Olympics
Bantamweight boxers
World bantamweight boxing champions
World super-bantamweight boxing champions
The Ring (magazine) champions
World Boxing Association champions